Agnese Pini (born 5 March 1985 in Carrara) is an Italian journalist. Beginning in 1 August 2019, she is director of La Nazione. She is the first woman in the newspaper's 160-year history to hold this post.

Life 
She decided to be a journalist after the attack of September 11, inspired by the coverage of Oriana Fallaci, Enzo Biagi, Dacia Maraini, Tiziano Terzani. She graduated from  University of Pisa  in 2007 with a thesis on the correspondence between Michelangelo Buonarroti and Vittoria Colonna. In 2009, she studied at the  University of Milan, Walter Tobagi School of Journalism.

She worked for Il Giorno, and collaborated with the ANSA agency, with Arnoldo Mondadori Editore and the L'Espresso publishing group. In June 2016, she joined the Sienese bureau of La Nazione, and the following year to the Florentine bureau.

References 

1985 births
Italian journalists
Living people
People from Carrara